The Peekskill riots took place at Cortlandt Manor, New York in 1949. The catalyst for the rioting was an announced concert by black singer Paul Robeson, who was well known for his strong pro-trade union stance, civil rights activism, communist affiliations, and anti-colonialism. The concert, organized as a benefit for the Civil Rights Congress, was scheduled to take place on August 27 in Lakeland Acres, just north of Peekskill.

Paul Robeson's remarks in Paris, 1949
Robeson had given three earlier concerts in Peekskill without incident, but in recent years Robeson had been increasingly vocal against the Ku Klux Klan and other forces of white supremacy, both domestically and internationally. Robeson specifically made a transformation from someone who was primarily a singer into a political persona who vocally supported, what were at the time considered, "communist" causes, including the decolonization of Africa, anti-Jim Crow legislation, and peace with the USSR. Robeson had also appeared before the House Committee on Un-American Activities to oppose a bill that would require communists to register as foreign agents and, just months before the concerts in 1949, he had appeared at the Soviet-sponsored World Peace Conference in Paris. Referring to the growing tensions between the USA and the USSR, he stated:

We in America do not forget that it was the backs of white workers from Europe and on the backs of millions of blacks that the wealth of America was built. And we are resolved to share it equally. We reject any hysterical raving that urges us to make war on anyone. Our will to fight for peace is strong...We shall support peace and friendship among all nations, with Soviet Russia and the People's Republics."Phillip S Foner, Paul Robeson Speaks, selected speeches and writings, 1978, p. 197"

What came over the wires to news agencies via the AP in the United States was as follows,

We colonial peoples have contributed to the building of the United States and are determined to share its wealth. We denounce the policy of the United States government which is similar to Hitler and Goebbels.... It is unthinkable that American Negros would go to war on behalf of those who have oppressed us for generations against the Soviet Union which in one generation has lifted our people to full human dignity.

Later examination of time records showed that the AP dispatched this fabricated version on its wires as Robeson began speaking. The comment was not investigated by the American press for its veracity and there was nationwide condemnation of Robeson. In the early stages of the Cold War and its accompanying wide anti-communist sentiments in the West, this statement was seen by many as very anti-American. The local paper, the Peekskill Evening Star, condemned the concert and encouraged people to make their position on communism felt, but did not directly espouse violence. The riots were explicitly racist, with the rioters shouting racist terms for African Americans and Jews, burning crosses, and lynching effigies of Robeson both in Peekskill and in other areas of the United States.

First concert
The concert, organized as a benefit for the Civil Rights Congress, was scheduled to take place on August 27 in Lakeland Acres, just north of Peekskill. Before Robeson arrived, a mob of locals attacked concert-goers with baseball bats and rocks. The local police arrived hours later and did little to intervene. Thirteen people were seriously injured, Robeson was lynched in effigy, and a cross was seen burning on an adjacent hillside. The concert was then postponed until September 4. and Negro spirituals ending with "Ol' Man River"

Robeson's accompaniment was provided by Larry Brown.

Aftermath
The aftermath of the concert, however, was far from peaceful. After some violence to south-going buses near the intersection of Locust Avenue and Hillside Avenue, Hillside Avenue having since been renamed Oregon Road, concertgoers were diverted to head northward to Oregon Corners and forced to run a gauntlet miles long of veterans and their families, who threw rocks through windshields of the cars and buses. Much of the violence was also caused by anti-Communist members of local Veterans of Foreign Wars and American Legion chapters. Standing off the angry mob of rioters chanting "go on back to Russia, you niggers" and "white niggers", some of the concertgoers and union members, along with writer Howard Fast and others assembled a non-violent line of resistance, locked arms, and sang the song "We Shall Not Be Moved." Some people were reportedly dragged from their vehicles and beaten. Over 140 people were injured and numerous vehicles were severely damaged as police stood by. 

Pete Seeger and Woody Guthrie
One car carried Woody Guthrie, Lee Hays, Pete Seeger, Seeger's wife Toshi, and his infant children. Guthrie pinned a shirt to the inside of the window to stop it shattering. "Wouldn't you know it, Woody pinned up a red shirt," Hays was to remember. Seeger used some of the thrown rocks to build the chimney of his cabin in the Town of Fishkill, New York, to stand as a reminder of the incident.

Eugene Bullard
Eugene Bullard, the first black combat pilot and decorated World War I veteran, was knocked to the ground and beaten by the mob, which included white members of state and local law enforcement. The beating was captured on film and can be seen in the 1970s documentary The Tallest Tree in Our Forest and the Oscar-winning, Sidney Poitier-narrated documentary Paul Robeson: Tribute to an Artist. Despite recorded evidence of the beating, no one was prosecuted for the assault. Graphic photos of Eugene Bullard being beaten by two policemen, a state trooper and concert-goer, were published in The Whole World in His Hands: A Pictorial Biography of Paul Robeson, by Susan Robeson.

Protests afterwards
Following the riots, more than 300 people went to Albany, New York to express their indignation to Governor Thomas Dewey, who refused to meet with them, blaming communists for provoking the violence. Twenty-seven plaintiffs filed a civil suit against Westchester County and two veterans' groups. The charges were dismissed three years later.

Reactions in the U.S. House of Representatives
Following the Peekskill riots, Democratic House Representative John E. Rankin of Mississippi condemned Robeson on the house floor. When Republican New York Congressman Jacob Javits spoke to the United States House of Representatives, deploring the Peekskill riots as a violation of constitutional guarantees of freedom of speech and free assembly, Rankin replied angrily: "It was not surprising to hear the gentlemen from New York defend the Communist enclave." Rankin said that he wanted it known that the American people are not in sympathy "with that Nigger Communist and that bunch of Reds who went up there." On a point of order, American Labor Party House Representative Vito Marcantonio protested to House Speaker Sam Rayburn that "the gentlemen from Mississippi used the word 'nigger.' I ask that the word be taken down and stricken from the RECORD inasmuch as there are two members in this house of Negro race." Rayburn claimed that Rankin had not said "nigger" but "Negro" but Rankin yelled over him saying "I said Niggra! Just as I have said since I have been able to talk and shall continue to say." Speaker Rayburn then defended Rankin, ruling that "the gentlemen from Mississippi is not subject to a point of order...referred to the Negro race and they should not be afraid of that designation." Then Democratic Representative Edward E. Cox of Georgia denounced Robeson on the House floor as a "Communist agent provocateur."

Aftermath
Within a few days, hundreds of editorials and letters appeared in newspapers across the nation and abroad by prominent individuals, organizations, trade unions, churches and others. They condemned the attacks and the failure of Governor Dewey and the State Police to protect the lives and property of citizens as well as called for a full investigation of the violence and prosecution of the perpetrators. Despite condemnation from progressives and civil rights activists, the mainstream press and local officials overwhelmingly blamed Robeson and his fans for "provoking" the violence. Following the Peekskill riots, other cities became fearful of similar incidents, and over 80 scheduled concert dates of Robeson's were canceled.

On September 12, 1949, in response to Robeson's controversial status in the press and leftist affiliations, the National Maritime Union convention considered a motion that Robeson's name be removed from the union's honorary membership list. The motion was withdrawn for lack of support among members. Later that month, the All-China Art and Literature Workers' Association and All-China Association of Musicians of Liberated China protested the Peekskill attack on Robeson. On October 2, 1949, Robeson spoke at a luncheon for the National Labor Conference for Peace, Ashland Auditorium, Chicago, and referred to the riots.

Legacy and reconciliation ceremonies
In recent years, Westchester County has gone to great lengths to make amends to the survivors of the riots by holding a commemorative ceremony, at which an apology was made for their treatment. In September 1999, county officials held a "Remembrance and Reconciliation Ceremony, 50th anniversary commemoration of the 1949 Peekskill riots." It included speakers Paul Robeson, Jr., folk singer Peter Seeger and several local elected officials.

The Peekskill riots in fiction
The Peekskill riots appear in E. L. Doctorow's novel The Book of Daniel. Paul Isaacson (a fictionalized version of Julius Rosenberg) leaves the bus to reason with the mob, and is beaten up by them.
The riots figure prominently in T.C. Boyle's World's End. The protagonist's adoptive parents serve as local, assistant organizers of the concert (alias of "Peterskill" riots within the book).
 In George Mandel's Flee the Angry Strangers, published in 1952, there is brief mention of the riots.
 In Ring Lardner Jr.'s The Ecstasy of Owen Muir  (1954), there is an extensive segment concerning the incidents at Peekskill.

The Peekskill riots in recording and film

Pete Seeger and The Weavers wrote and recorded a song about the riots titled "Hold the Line".
Song: "Let Robeson Sing" by Manic Street Preachers
Song: "My Thirty Thousand" by Woody Guthrie, later recorded by Billy Bragg and Wilco
Song: "Three Chords and The Truth" written and recorded by Ry Cooder
Song: ”The Peekskill Story”(Casetta/Hayes/Seeger) The Weavers with Howard Fast and Pete Seeger
Radio: NPR's 50th anniversary commemoration of Peekskill riots
Radio: The Peekskill Riots, Maryknoll Sisters radio documentary
Radio: NBC Radio Interviews
Video: The Robeson Concerts
Video: Paul Robeson: Here I Stand, PBS American Masters
Video: Paul Robeson: Speak of Me As I Am BBC
Film: Joe Glory
Film: Paul Robeson: The Tallest Tree in Our Forest
Film: Paul Robeson: Portrait of an Artist

See also
List of incidents of civil unrest in the United States

References

External links
The Robeson Concerts: Peekskill, New York, 1949 dead link
FBI documents on the Peekskill riots peekskil_riots.htm document removed
The Peekskill Story
Courtney, Steve. "Peekskill's days of infamy: The Robeson riots of 1949," The Reporter Dispatch, September 5, 1982. Sec. AA: pp. 1,4-5.
 Daniel Frontino Elash Peekskill Remembered
 Feingold, Joel Remembering Peekskill

1949 riots
1949 in New York (state)
August 1949 events in the United States
Antisemitism in New York (state)
Anti-black racism in the United States
September 1949 events in the United States
Anti-communism in the United States
History of racism in New York (state)
Riots and civil disorder in New York (state)
Paul Robeson
Peekskill, New York
White American riots in the United States
African-American history of Westchester County, New York